Shin Dong-ho (born June 29, 1994) is a former South Korean singer who acquired fame as a singer of the boy group U-KISS. Dongho was the most active member of the group, appearing in a great many reality shows and other productions. He joined U-KISS in 2008 and stayed with them for five years.

Life and career
He attended middle school in Seoul Yonggang Middle School and graduated from Hanlim Multi Art School. He became a trainee for NH Media and was chosen as one of the potential members for an upcoming boyband.

Dongho joined U-KISS in 2008, and appeared in reality shows such as Idol Maknae Rebellion, Raising Idol, and Sonyeon Sonyeo Gayo Baekseo.

His first acting role was a middle-school student in Villain and Widow, and performed in the MBC drama Royal Family. He voiced the lead character in a 3-D animation movie, Hong Gil Dong 2084 (2011). Along with co-U-KISS member Yeo Hoonmin he was cast for a TV-movie series, Holy Land (2012). He was the lead in Don't Cry Mommy. On October 16, 2013, NH media announced that Dongho left U-KISS. In the end, he chose to leave the entertainment industry entirely in 2013.

Personal life
Dongho got married in 2015; he and his wife have a son. In September 2018, Dongho confirmed his divorce. He stated he and his wife did not separate due to a bad relationship so they will take responsibility for their child as parents despite not being a married couple. He added he hoped this will not affect his son as he grows up.

Filmography
2010
 Villain and Widow
2011
 My Black Mini Dress
 Mr. Idol (cameo)
 Hong Gil Dong 2084
 Royal Family (TV series)
2012
 Don't Cry Mommy
 Holy Land
 A Man Who Feeds The Dog

References

External links
 

1994 births
Living people
South Korean male idols
South Korean pop singers
South Korean male film actors
South Korean male television actors
U-KISS members
Hanlim Multi Art School alumni
21st-century South Korean male  singers